Linda Connor (born in New York, November 18, 1944) is an American photographer living in San Francisco, California. She is known for her landscape photography.

She has photographed in a multitude of countries throughout her career including, but not limited to, India, Mexico, Thailand, Ireland, Peru, and Nepal. Connor is a professor for the Photography Department at the San Francisco Art Institute, where she has taught since 1969. From 1985 to 1999 she also served as a board member for Friends of Photography. That same year, Connor then became founder & president of Photo Alliance.

Early life and career 
Connor began working in photography at 17, exploring her interest in spiritualism. Her early photographic influences include Walker Evans, Emmet Gowin, Harry Callahan, Julia Margaret Cameron and Frederick Sommer.

She attended the Rhode Island School of Design between 1963 and 1967 where she received a BFA in Photography. She later attended the Institute of Design, Illinois Institute of Technology between the years of 1967–1969, where she received her MFA. In 1969, Connor began teaching at San Francisco Art Institute, instructing graduates and undergraduates for over 40 years.

Her first group exhibition was Vision and Expression at George Eastman House, in 1968 in Rochester, NY. In the entirety of her career she has received 11 awards, held over 40 solo exhibitions, and was featured in over 20 group exhibitions. These awards include a Guggenheim and three National Endowment for the Arts grants.

Style and technique 
One of Connor's most notable images include a photograph of a ceremonial cloth carefully wrapped around a tree trunk in Bali, petroglyphs hidden in the cliff dwellings of Arizona, star trails in Mexico, and votive candles arranged for ceremonial rites at Chartres. In her early work, Connor used an 8×10 inch Century View camera with a soft focus lens as a mechanism to imbue her photographs with a sense of abstraction. In her later work, Connor adjusted her camera to provide much greater clarity and detail. To achieve a sense of the mystical with a sharp lens, however, Connor photographed items and structures that are already perceived as mystical in themselves. In India and Nepal, she found sacred landscapes with ritual magic that she could photograph with a sharp lens and still achieve a sense of timelessness. Connor’s books present her photographs without titles (which are given at the end of her books) and with the places mixed up in no recognizable geographic or chronological order according to emotion and tone.

. In 2010, she began having her work reprinted in such varied formats as archival pigment prints, as an accordion-shaped book, and as large-format prints on silk.

Prominent works

Petroglyphs 

Some of Connor's photographs included petroglyphs. Connor and four other photographs attempted to preserve the petroglyphs photographically, resulting in the book, Marks in Place: Contemporary Responses to Prehistoric Rock Art (1988). A 1996 The New Yorker essay asserted that the photos "combine generalized forms, like shadows and silhouettes, with richly compelling detail." Connor captures man-made elements in natural environments in order to evoke spiritualism, "addressing quite literally the issue of how people have made their mark upon the landscape."

The Olson House 
The Olson House is a colonial farmhouse located in Cushing, Maine. The popularity of this farmhouse came from its depiction in painter Andrew Wyeth's famed Christina's World. Connor is not the only artist to take photographs of Olson House. The location has also been photographed by such notable artists Paul Caponigro and George Tice. In 2006, Connor was commissioned to photograph the site by the Cincinnati Art Museum. Though a few of her photographs of the Olson House reference Wyeth, her depiction nonetheless accomplishes the difficult task of being distinctive and separate from Wyeth's .

Spiral Journey and Odyssey 
Connor collected her life's photographic projects in two books, one titled Spiral Journey and the other titled Odyssey: Photographs by Linda Connor. Spiral Journey is an extensive retrospective book and exhibitions of her photographs made between 1967 and 1990 in Africa, Asia, Australia, Europe, North America, and South America. Odyssey: Photographs by Linda Connor is another retrospective book and exhibitions published by Chronicle Books in 2008 containing 133 photographs. The exhibitions toured across art museums in the US from 2008 – 2011 with a monograph containing "transcripts of conversations between Connor, Robert Adams and Emmet Gowin." These retrospectives make clear that Connor's primary interest has been exploring places "steeped in the passage of time and resonant with spirituality.” Both works primarily consist of landscape photography in relation to culture and to spiritualism, using an 8x10 inch view camera and printed on slow contact print paper.

Feminism in landscape photography 

Like other women photographers working within the subject matter, Connor contends that men have traditionally photographed landscapes. She offers instead a "theory of women's landscape imagery, one that posits a more intimate, emotional response to Nature because women somehow have more affinity with it."(Deborah Bright, p. 138) In a public lecture, Connor refers to photographer Gretchen Garner's thesis, "Reclaiming Paradise," Connor stated that male landscape photographers aim to 'conquer' the land with their photographs. Connor stated “is it too farfetched... to link man's passion for new lands, high places, the challenges of nature, landscape photography with pissing? This is territorial claiming and marking at its most basic. And what better place to piss off of than the top of a mountain-marking a vista." Although Connor's view has been criticized as "essentialist," she is not alone in believing that her landscapes convey a symbiotic relationship with nature.

Awards 
2005        Honored Educator, Society of Photographic Educators
2002        Flintridge Foundation Award for Visual Artists
2001        Flintridge Foundation Award for Visual Artists
1998        Best Book of the Year, 21st- A Contemporary Photography Journal, for On the Music of Spheres
1997        7th Annual LifeWork Award, Falkirk Cultural Center
1994        National Endowment for the Arts, Travel Grant
1988        Charles Pratt Award
1988        National Endowment for the Arts, Individual Grant
1986        Photographer of the Year, Peer Awards, Friends of Photography, Carmel, CA
1979        Guggenheim Fellowship
1976        National Endowment for the Arts, Individual Grant

Exhibitions

Solo exhibitions 
2017        LINDA CONNOR – Photographs, G. Gibson Gallery, Seattle, WA

2017        Linda Connor: Gravity, Florida Museum of Photographic Arts, Tampa, FL

2013        Linda Connor: From Two Worlds, di Rosa Center for Contemporary Art, Napa, CA

2013        Linda Connor: Continuum, Candela Books + Gallery, Richmond, VA

2012        Linda Connor, Clark Gallery, Lincoln, MA

2012        From Two Worlds, Haines Gallery, San Francisco, CA

2011        Odyssey: The Photographs of Linda Connor, Point Light Gallery, Surry Hills, Australia

2011        Linda Connor: New Direction, Viewpoint Gallery, Sacramento, CA

2010        Odyssey: The Photographs of Linda Connor, Palm Springs Art Museum, Palm Springs, CA

2010        Odyssey: The Photographs of Linda Connor, Museum of Art, Rhode Island School of Design, Providence, RI

2010        Linda Connor, Clark Gallery, Lincoln, MA

2010        Linda Connor: New Work, Newspace Center for Photography, Portland, OR

2009        Odyssey: the photographs of Linda Connor, Phoenix Art Museum, Phoenix, AZ

2009        Odyssey: the photographs of Linda Connor, Center for Creative Photography, Tucson, AZ

2009        Linda Connor, Joseph Bellows Gallery, La Jolla, CA

2009        Odyssey: The Photographs of Linda Connor, Southeast Museum of Photography, Daytona, FL

2008        Himalayas, Haines Gallery, San Francisco, CA

2007        Linda Connor Photographs, Sacramento State University, Sacramento, CA

2007        Olson House Photographs, Cincinnati Art Museum, Cincinnati, OH

2007        Linda Connor, Department of Design Gallery, Mariposa Hall, Sacramento State, Sacramento, CA

2006        Linda Connor Photographs, Sun Valley Art Museum, Ketchum, ID

2005        A Clear Vision” by Linda Connor, The Creative Center for Photography Freestyle, Los Angeles, CA

2004        Linda Connor: Starfields & Constellations, Yancey Richardson Gallery, New York, NY

2003        Linda Connor: Continuum, Haines Gallery, San Francisco, CA

2003        Time, Place, Sequences, Sonoma Museum of Visual Art at the Luther Burbank Center for the Arts, Santa Rosa, CA

2003        Linda Connor: Photographs, Photo Gallery International, Tokyo Japan

2001        Linda Connor, Glen Horowitz Bookseller, East Hampton, NY

2001        The Heavens, G. Gibson Gallery, Seattle, WA

2001        Recent Photographs, Haines Gallery, San Francisco, CA

2001        Towards Light, Yancey Richardson Gallery, New York, NY

1997        Linda Connor, Life Work Award, Falkirk Cultural Center, San Rafael, CA

1997        Linda Connor, PARTS Photographic Arts, Minneapolis, MN

1997        Linda Connor, Spectrum Gallery, Fresno, CA

1996        Linda Connor – Diptychs, photo-eye Gallery, Santa Fe, NM

1994        Earthly Constellations, National Museum of American Art, Washington, D.C.

1993        Earthly Constellations, Museum of Photographic Arts, San Diego, CA

1992        Harry Callahan & Linda Connor, Light Factory, Charlotte, NC

1992        Earthly Constellations, San Francisco Museum of Modern Art, San Francisco, CA

1990        Spiritual Journey, Museum of Contemporary Photography, Chicago, IL

1988        Linda Connor, Art Institute of Chicago, Chicago, IL

1988        Gallery Min, Tokyo, Japan

1986        Falkirk Cultural Center, San Rafael, California

1982        Center for Creative Photography, University of Arizona, Tucson, AZ

1973        Light Gallery, New York City, N.Y.

Group exhibitions 
2018        Speak to the Stones, and the Stars Answer, Haines Gallery, San Francisco, CA

2017        Shadowland: Photographs from the Collection, Daum Museum of Contemporary Art, Sedalia, MO

2017        Pop- Up, G. Gibson Gallery, Seattle, WA

2017        Maija Fiebig, Thuy-Van Vu and Linda Connor, G. Gibson Gallery, Seattle, WA

2017        The Poetry of Place, Cincinnati Art Museum, Cincinnati, OH

2017        The Sun Placed in the Abyss, Columbus Museum of Art, Columbus, OH

2016        LUX: The Radiant Sea, Yancey Richardson Gallery, New York, NY

2015        Regarding Trees: Vintage and Contemporary Selections, Joseph Bellows Gallery, San Diego, CA

2015        The Mapmaker's Dream, Haines Gallery, San Francisco, CA

2015        DWELL, G. Gibson Gallery, Seattle, WA

2014        Local Treasures: Bay Area Photography, Berkeley Art Center, Berkeley, CA

2014        Starstruck: The Fine Art of Astrophotography, James A. Michener Art Museum, Doylestown, PA

2012        SOLAR, photo-eye Gallery, Santa Fe, NM

2012        When Heaven Meets Earth, Datz Museum of Art, Gwangju-si, Gyeonggi-do, Korea

2012        Tracing Light, Datz Museum of Art, Gwangju-si, Gyeonggi-do, Korea

2012        Growth & Gravity: Linda Connor & Yoshitomo Saito, Goodwin Fine Art Gallery, Denver, CO

2012        Consilience: Photographers Operating at the Intersection of Art & Science, International Center of Photography, New York, NY

2000        Three Landscape Photographers, photo-eye Gallery, Santa Fe, NM

1994        Allan Chasanoff Photographic Collection: Tradition and the Unpredictable, The Museum of Fine Arts, Houston, TX

1994        Selections from the Permanent Collection: Image and Text, Center for Creative Photography, the University of Arizona, Tucson, AZ

1993        Mexico through Foreign Eyes, International Center for Photography, New York

1991        Between Home and Heaven: Contemporary American Landscape Photography, National Museum of American Art, Washington, DC

1990        Photographs by American Women Artists, California Museum of Photography, UC Riverside, Riverside, CA

1988        Landscapes from the Permanent Collection, Corcoran Gallery of Art, Washington, DC

1986        Artist in Mid-Career, San Francisco Museum of Modern Art, San Francisco, CA

1985        American Images, Photography 1945–80, Barbican Art Gallery, London, England

1982        The Contact Print, Friends of Photography, Carmel, CA

1979        American Photography in the '70, The Art Institute of Chicago, Chicago, IL

1977        Mirrors and Windows – American Photography Since 1960, Museum of Modern Art, New York City, NY

1968        Vision and Expression, George Eastman House, Rochester, NY

Collections 
Art Institute of Chicago, Chicago, IL
Center for Creative Photography, University of Arizona, Tucson, AZ
International Museum of Photography, George Eastman House, Rochester, NY
J. Paul Getty Museum, Los Angeles, CA
Museum of Modern Art, New York, NY
National Gallery of Canada, Ottawa, ON
Victoria and Albert Museum, London, England
San Francisco Museum of Modern Art, San Francisco, CA
Museum of Fine Arts, Houston, TX
Stanford Art Museum, Palo Alto, CA
Yale Art Museum, Yale University, CT
Vassar College Art Gallery, Arlington, NY
Rhode Island School of Design Museum, Providence, RI
National Museum of American Art, Washington, D.C.
Yildiz University, Istanbul, TU
Honolulu Academy of Art, Honolulu, HI
Canadian Center for Photography
Seattle Art Museum, Seattle, WA
San Jose Museum of Art, San Jose, CA
New Mexico State University Art Gallery, University Park, NM
The Minneapolis Institute of Arts, Minneapolis, MN

Bibliography 
Odds & Ends. Linda Connor. Edition One Studios, 2010

Odyssey. Linda Connor. Chronicle, San Francisco, California, 2008 

Heaven / Earth. Linda Connor. Lodima Press / Michael A. Smith, 2008 

The Angle of Repose: Four American Photographers in Egypt. Emily Teeter. LaSalle Bank, N.A., 2002 

Black & White Photography. Manifest Visions / An International Collection. Numerous contributing photographers/James Luciana. Gloucester, Massachusetts, 2000 

Aperture 157 Steps in Space. Numerous contributing photographers / Mark Holburn. Aperture, New York, New York, 1999 

Contact Sheet 97. 25th Anniversary Edition. Jeffrey Hoone, Deborah Willis, Carole Kismaric, Marvin Heiferman, and Gary Nickard. Light Work, Syracuse, New York, 1998 

On the Music of the Spheres. Linda Connor. Whitney Museum, New York, New York, 1997

Visits. Linda Connor. Robert B. Menschel, Syracuse, New York, 1996

Luminance, LUX III. Linda Connor. Center for Photographic Arts, Carmel, California, 1995 

Photography in the 1990s: Fifty Portfolios. CD-ROM. Wright State University, Dayton, Ohio, 1995

Absorbing Light. Linda Connor/Michael Read. View Camera, July / August, 1994

Kyoto Journal: The Sacred Mountains of Asia. 1994

Between Home and Heaven: Contemporary American Landscape Photography. Natural Museum of American Art, Smithsonian Institution and the University of New Mexico, 1992 

Mexico through Foreign Eyes. Pilar Perez and Assoc., 1992

The Kiss of Apollo: Photography and Sculpture 1845 to Present. Fraenkel Gallery and Bedford, San Francisco, California, 1991

Spiral Journey. Linda Connor. Museum of Contemporary Photography, Columbia College, Chicago, Illinois, 1990

Women in Photography. Constance Sullivan. Abrams, New York, 1990

Decade by Decade: Twentieth Century American Photography. Collection of the Center for Creative Photography, Tucson, Arizona, 1989

Marks in Place. Linda Connor. University of New Mexico Press, Albuquerque, New Mexico, 1987 

Wanderlust. Work by Eight Contemporary Photographers from the Hallmark Photographic Collection. Keith F. Davis. Kansas City, Kansas, 1987 

Linda Connor. Linda Connor. Corcoran Gallery of Art, Washington, D.C., 1982

American Images: New Work by Twenty Contemporary Photographers. Renato Danese ed. McGraw-Hill, 1979 

Solos: Photographs by Linda Connor. Linda Connor. Millertown, New York, 1979

References

Further reading

 
 
 
 
 
 
 
 
 
 
 
 
 
 
 
 
 
 
 
 
 
 
 
 
 
 
 

American photographers
Living people
Illinois Institute of Technology alumni
1944 births
Rhode Island School of Design alumni
San Francisco Art Institute faculty
Artists from the San Francisco Bay Area
20th-century American women photographers
20th-century American photographers
American women academics
21st-century American women